Lonnie McIntosh (July 18, 1941 – April 21, 2016), known as Lonnie Mack, was an American singer-songwriter and guitarist. He was an influential trailblazer of blues rock music and rock guitar soloing.

Mack emerged in 1963 with his breakthrough LP, The Wham of that Memphis Man. It earned him lasting renown as both a blue-eyed soul singer and a lead guitar innovator. In the album's instrumental tracks, Mack added "edgy, aggressive, loud, and fast" melodies and runs to the standard chords-and-riffs pattern of early rock guitar. These tracks raised the bar for rock guitar proficiency and helped launch the electric guitar to the top of soloing instruments in rock. They also became prototypes for the lead guitar styles of blues rock and Southern rock.

Shortly after the album's release, however, the massively popular "British Invasion" hit American shores, and Mack's recording career "withered on the vine". He regularly toured small venues until 1968, when Rolling Stone magazine rediscovered him, and Elektra Records signed him to a three-album contract. He was soon performing in major venues, but his multi-genre Elektra albums downplayed his lead guitar and blues rock appeal and record sales were modest. Mack left Elektra in 1971. For the next fourteen years he was a low-profile multi-genre recording artist, roadhouse performer, sideman, and music-venue proprietor.

In 1985, Mack resurfaced with a successful blues rock LP, Strike Like Lightning, a promotional tour featuring celebrity guitarist sit-ins, and a Carnegie Hall concert with Roy Buchanan and Albert Collins. In 1986, he went on "The Great 
American Guitar Assault Tour" with Buchanan and Dickey Betts. In 1990, he released another well-received blues rock album, Lonnie Mack Live! Attack of the Killer V, then retired from recording. He continued to perform, mostly in small venues, until 2004.

Early life and musical influences

Shortly before Mack's birth, his family moved from Appalachian (eastern) Kentucky to Dearborn County, Indiana, on the banks of the Ohio River. One of five children, he was born to parents Robert and Sarah Sizemore McIntosh on July 18, 1941, in West Harrison, Indiana, near Cincinnati, Ohio. He was raised on a series of nearby sharecropping farms.

Using a floor-model radio powered by a truck battery, his family routinely listened to the Grand Ole Opry country music show. Continuing to listen after the rest of the family had retired for the night, Mack became a fan of rhythm and blues and traditional black gospel music.

He began playing guitar at the age of seven, after trading his bicycle for a "Lone Ranger" model acoustic guitar. His mother taught him basic chords, and he was soon playing bluegrass guitar in the family band. Mack recalled that when he was "seven or eight years old" an uncle from Texas introduced him to blues guitar and that when he was about ten years of age, an "old black man" named Wayne Clark introduced him to "Robert Johnson style guitar". He soon taught himself to merge finger-picking country guitar with acoustic blues-picking, to produce a hybrid style which, Mack said, "sounded like rockabilly, but before rockabilly".

His musical influences remained diverse as he refined his playing and singing styles. In his pre-teen years, Mack was mentored by blind singer-guitarist Ralph Trotto, a well-regarded country-gospel performer. Mack would skip school to play music with Trotto at the latter's house. Mack considered country picker Merle Travis, pop/jazz guitarist Les Paul, and electric blues guitarist T-Bone Walker the most significant influences on his developing guitar style. Significant vocal influences included R&B singers Jimmy Reed, Ray Charles, Bobby "Blue" Bland, and Hank Ballard, country singer George Jones, traditional black gospel singer Archie Brownlee, and soul music singer Wilson Pickett. Mack recorded tunes associated with each of these artists.

Career

Mack's career-long pattern of switching and mixing within the entire range of white and black Southern roots music genres made him "as difficult to market as he was to describe."  He enjoyed periods of significant commercial success as a rock artist in the 1960s and 1980s, but was mostly absent from the rock spotlight for two long stretches of his career (1971–1984 and 1991–2004), during which he continued to perform, mostly in small venues, as a roots-rock "cult figure". In the end, his "influence and standing among musicians far exceeded his (commercial) success."

In 1954, at age 13, Mack dropped out of school after a fight with a teacher. Large and mature-looking for his age, he obtained a counterfeit ID and began performing professionally in bars around Cincinnati with a band led by drummer Hoot Smith. As a 14-year-old professional electric guitarist in 1955, he "was earning $300. per week—more than most workers in the area's casket and whiskey factories."  At 15, he was performing on local TV with his band, the Twilighters. He played guitar on several low-circulation recordings in the late 1950s.

In the early 1960s he became a session guitarist with Fraternity Records, a small Cincinnati label. In 1963, he recorded two hit singles for Fraternity, the proto-blues-rock guitar instrumentals "Memphis" and "Wham!" He soon recorded additional tunes to flesh out his debut album, The Wham of that Memphis Man (1963). Mack made some notable recordings later, particularly in the 1980s, but his 1963 debut album is widely considered the centerpiece of his career. It became a perennial critics' favorite:

1968: Guitar: "...in a class by himself."...Vocals: "...sincerity and intensity that's hard to find anywhere." – Alec Dubro, Rolling Stone, calling for re-issuance of Mack's discontinued 1963 debut album. 
1987: "With so many trying to copy this same style, this album sounds surprisingly modern. Not many have done it this well, though. – Gregory Himes, The Washington Post
1992: "The first of the guitar-hero records is also one of the best, and for perhaps the last time, the singing on such a disc is worthy of the guitar histrionics." – Jimmy Guterman, ranking the album No. 16 in The 100 Best Rock 'n' Roll Records of All Time
2007: "...a spectacular feast of down-home blues, gospel, R&B, and country chicken-pickin'...a unique vision of American roots music [that was] five years ahead of the British blues-rockers." – Dave Rubin, Inside the Blues, 1942–1982
2016: "Of all the Mack material available this is the one [album] I'd regard as absolutely essential." – Dave Stephens, Toppermost

He recorded many additional sides for Fraternity between 1963 and 1967, but few, if any, were broadly released or strongly promoted, and none charted. Three decades later, Ace Records (UK) packaged the entirety of Mack's Fraternity output (previously released, unreleased, alternate takes, and demos) in a series of compilations. In the mid-'60s, however, Mack's commercial prospects were stymied by Fraternity's thin financial resources and, even more, by the arrival of the overwhelmingly popular British Invasion only two months after release of The Wham of that Memphis Man. "It looked like the guitar wizard was ready to bust out when the music world was turned on its ear. [In] February 1964, The Beatles appeared on the Ed Sullivan Show, and Mack's [recording] career withered on the vine."

Although his recording career had stalled out, Mack stayed busy as a performer, criss-crossing the country with one-night stands. "The '60s, man, we was full of piss and vinegar, nothing bothered us. We had bennies, like the truckers had [and] we just stayed on the road all the time." During that time, "[we] performed with just about everybody, [from] Jimi Hendrix [to] The Everly Brothers, Chuck Berry, and Dick and Dee Dee." He also took on session work with James Brown, Freddie King, Joe Simon, Albert Washington, and other R&B/soul artists.

In 1968, at the height of the blues-rock era, Elektra Records bought out Mack's dormant Fraternity recording contract and moved him to Los Angeles to record three albums. In November 1968, the newly-founded Rolling Stone magazine published a rave review of Mack's discontinued 1963 debut album, persuading Elektra to re-issue it. He was soon performing in major rock venues, including the Fillmore East, the Fillmore West, and the Cow Palace. He opened for The Doors and Crosby, Stills & Nash and shared the stage with Johnny Winter, Elvin Bishop and other popular rock and blues artists of the time.

It was the hippie era, however, and Mack's rustic, blue-collar persona made for a rough fit with commercial rock's target demographic. John Morthland wrote: "[All] the superior chops in the world couldn't hide the fact that chubby, country Mack probably had more in common with Kentucky truck drivers than he did with the new rock audience." In addition, after two multi-genre Elektra albums (both recorded in 1969) that downplayed his blues-rock strengths, including his guitar, Mack himself was dissatisfied: "My music wasn't working that good then. I ain’t really happy with a lot of the stuff I did there."

At that point in his career, Mack took a break from performing and recording. According to Robbie Krieger, lead guitarist of Elektra label-mate The Doors, Mack was seen during this period "selling Bibles out of the back of his car." He also worked for Elektra's A&R department, helping to recruit new talent. In 1971, with one album left to complete his contract with Elektra, Mack moved to Nashville. There, he recorded The Hills of Indiana, a multi-genre (but country-flavored) LP with a vocal emphasis. It included only one track showcasing his guitar virtuosity, Asphalt Outlaw Hero. Hills attracted little attention.

Mack had begun missing the fun of small-town performance venues early in his time with Elektra and soon soured on the fantasy of rock celebrity status. "[It had] a lot to do with how much value you put on money as opposed to what makes you happy. I wasn't happy. So one of the best-feeling moments I ever had was when that L.A. sign was in my rear-view mirror and I was free again." On another occasion, Mack said: "Seems like every time I get close to really making it, to climbing to the top of the mountain, that's when I pull out. I just pull up and run." Upon Mack's death in 2016, music historian Dick Shurman observed that Mack's country-boy temperament "wasn't suited to stardom. I think he'd rather have been hunting and fishing. He didn't like cities or the (music) business."

In 1971, with his Elektra contract completed, Mack went home to southern Indiana, where, for more than a decade, he was a roadhouse performer, sideman, and low-profile country/bluegrass recording artist. During this period, he also owned and operated a nightclub in Covington, Kentucky and an outdoor country music venue in Friendship, Indiana. In 1977, Mack was shot during an altercation with an off-duty police officer. The experience inspired Mack's tune, Cincinnati Jail, a rowdy, guitar-and-vocal rock number that he favored in live performances later in his career.

In 1983, Mack relocated to Austin, Texas for a collaboration with his blues-rock disciple, guitarist Stevie Ray Vaughan. Vaughan urged Mack to return to the studio, with Vaughan in production and backup roles, but Mack's return was postponed by a lengthy illness that Mack attributed to "so much drinkin' and carryin' on". In 1985, Mack staged a "full-fledged comeback" with the blues-rock album, Strike Like Lightning (co-produced by Vaughan and Mack), a tour featuring guest appearances by Vaughan, Ry Cooder, Keith Richards, and Ronnie Wood, and a concert at Carnegie Hall with Albert Collins and Roy Buchanan.

In 1986, Mack joined Buchanan and Dickey Betts for "The Great American Guitar Assault Tour". 
He released three more albums over the next four years, including his last, in 1990, a blues-rock LP entitled Lonnie Mack Live! – Attack of the Killer V!. Then, worn from the constant touring required to sell records, he ended his recording career. However, he continued to play the roadhouse and festival circuits at his own pace through 2004.

"Memphis" and "Wham!"
On March 12, 1963, at the end of a recording session backing up The Charmaines, Mack was offered the remaining twenty minutes of studio-rental time. He recorded an energetic instrumental take-off on Chuck Berry's "Memphis, Tennessee". He had improvised it a few years earlier, when his keyboardist, Denzil "Dumpy" Rice, who normally sang and played the Berry tune, was absent for a performance. Mack didn't know the lyrics, but when the audience called for the tune, he improvised a highly embellished electric guitar instrumental based on the tune. He kept it as part of his live act, calling it simply "Memphis".

As recorded in 1963, "Memphis" featured a brisk melodic blues solo within a rockabilly/Memphis Soul framework, augmented by a rock drum-beat. It represented a significant advance in rock guitar virtuosity, beyond both the prevailing chords-and-riffs standard of Chuck Berry and the "inherently simple" melodic soloing standard of such early rock guitarists as Link Wray and Duane Eddy.

Mack recalled that, upon recording the tune, "It didn't mean a thing to me. I left to go on the road. We hit every roadhouse between Cincinnati and Miami, but we didn't have time to listen to the radio, so I didn't know what was going on [until] we were backing Chubby Checker one night. [T]he disc jockey came runnin' up to me, saying, 'You got the No. 1 record on our station!'" By late June, Memphis had risen to No. 4 on Billboard's R&B chart and No. 5 on Billboard's pop chart. According to The Book of Golden Discs, it sold over one million copies. The popularity of "Memphis" led to bookings at larger venues, at least one tour in the UK, and performances with Chuck Berry.

Still in 1963, Mack released "Wham!", a gospel-esque guitar rave-up. It reached No. 24 on Billboard's Pop chart in September. Although Memphis was the bigger hit, many associate the faster-paced Wham! (and the lesser-known, but still faster Chicken-Pickin''' from 1964) with the guitar style he pioneered. From Legends of Rock Guitar:

Mack's early guitar recordings remain closely identified with the dawn of virtuoso blues-rock guitar. Music critic Bill Millar: "The term ‘influential’ is applied to almost anyone these days but there's still a case for saying that the massively popular blues-rock guitar genre can be traced way back to the strength, power and emotional passion of Lonnie Mack."

 Guitar style and technique 

Mack's rock guitar proficiency has been linked to his early mastery of fleet-fingered bluegrass and country guitar styles. By his late teens, Mack had expanded his six-string repertoire to include blues, rockabilly, and the percussive chordal riffing of early rock's Chuck Berry.

By 1963, the year of "Memphis" and "Wham!", Mack's ability to rapidly "exploit the entire range" of the guitar was considerably above the rock music standard.  In Memphis, Wham!, Chicken Pickin, Suzie-Q, and other early-1960s instrumentals, he augmented rock guitar's then-prevailing chords-and-riffs accompaniment style with unusually brisk leads consisting largely of melodies, runs, and "mature blues chops". In addition, he routinely alternated between agile melodic leads and rhythmic chordal riffs, a pattern soon emulated by others, including Jeff Beck and Stevie Ray Vaughan. While these performance elements had sometimes appeared in early rock saxophone and keyboard solos, the combination of all was essentially unheard in rock guitar before Mack.

Mack enhanced his guitar sound with overlapping vibrato effects. In the 1960s, he used a '50s-era Magnatone amplifier to produce a constant, electronically generated, watery-sounding vibrato, in the style of R&B guitarist Robert Ward (blues musician). Throughout his career, he also used a Bigsby vibrato arm to bend the pitch selectively. He typically cradled the arm in the fourth finger of his picking hand, toggling it while continuing to pick. He often fanned it rapidly to the tempo of his simultaneous tremolo picking, to produce a machine-gunned, single-note, "shuddering" sound. Neil Young considers Mack a vibrato arm pioneer: "Did I do that first? No. You've got to look at guys like Lonnie Mack. He showed everybody how to use a [vibrato arm].". Reportedly, the device was given its common nickname, "whammy bar", in recognition of Mack's early demonstration of skill with it in Wham!.

Rock historian Dave Stephens rates Mack's overall guitar sound "highly distinctive, dare I say, unique; in the early rock era only Link Wray and Duane Eddy could match him for instant recognition."

Mack's role in the evolution of rock lead guitar

Although notable commercial success was periodic and fleeting, Mack's early-'60s recordings became rock guitar trendsetters. They raised the bar for rock guitar proficiency, helped propel the electric guitar to the top of soloing instruments in rock, and were prototypes for the genres of blues-rock and Southern rock.

Interviewed for a biography of Southern Rock guitar legend Duane Allman, guitarist and early Allman associate Mike Johnstone recalled the professional impact of Mack's rock guitar proficiency when he and Allman were starting out:

Mack's "edgy, aggressive, loud, and fast" blues guitar sound is also credited with a key role in the electric guitar's rise to the top of soloing instruments in rock. Blues critic Shawn Hagood wrote:

Former Elektra A&R executive James Webber agrees:

Mack's early-'60s guitar tracks are said to have set the stage for "blues-rock" guitar and "Southern rock" guitar, styles that first enjoyed broad popularity a few years after Memphis and Wham!. From Legends of Rock Guitar (1997):

Southern rock (Allman Brothers) lead guitarist Warren Haynes expressed a similar assessment:

Mack's 1963 debut album has been called "the first of the guitar hero records" for its introduction of flashy, technically challenging melodies and runs to rock guitar solos. As such, it is said to have begun rock guitar's "modern" era. In 1980, "Memphis" (1963) led Guitar World magazine's list of rock guitar's top-five "landmark" recordings, ahead of entire albums by Jimi Hendrix, Eric Clapton, Elvin Bishop, and Mike Bloomfield, whose own blues-infused solos exemplified rock's lead guitar "revolution" of the late 1960s.

According to The New York Times, Mack's guitar style was "a seminal influence on a long list of British and American" rock guitar soloists. Those who have claimed Mack as a major or significant influence include Stevie Ray Vaughan (blues rock), Jeff Beck (blues rock, jazz-rock), Neil Young (hard rock; country-tinged folk rock), Ted Nugent (hard rock), Dickey Betts (Southern rock), Warren Haynes (Southern rock), Ray Benson (Western swing), Bootsy Collins (funk), Adrian Belew (impressionist rock), Wayne Perkins (multi-genre), and Tyler Morris (multi-genre). According to a variety of sources, Mack similarly influenced guitarists Joe Bonamassa (blues-rock), Eric Clapton (blues-rock), Duane Allman (Southern rock), Gary Rossington (Southern rock), Steve Gaines (Southern rock), Mike Bloomfield (blues-rock), Jerry Garcia (psychedelic rock), Jimi Hendrix (psychedelic blues-rock), Keith Richards (blues-rock), Jimmy Page (blues-rock), and Danny Gatton (blues rock; jazz rock).

Mack said: "It's a great honor to be able to [inspire other artists]. What you do in this business, your whole thing is givin' stuff away. But that makes you feel good, makes you feel like you've really done something."

Mack's 1958 Gibson Flying V Guitar, "Number 7"
Mack was closely identified with the distinctive-looking Gibson Flying V guitar that first appeared in 1958. When he was seventeen, he bought the seventh Flying V off the first-year production line, naming it "Number 7". 
Mack, who was part Native American, had spent his youth with bow-and-arrow, and was viscerally attracted to the arrow-like shape of the guitar.

Mack played "Number 7" almost exclusively throughout his career. Early in his career, Mack added a Bigsby vibrato bar to the guitar. It required mounting a steel crossbeam approximately six inches below the apex of the "V", giving the guitar a unique appearance. The title of Mack's final album, Attack of the Killer V, was a reference to his guitar.

In 1993, Gibson Guitar Corporation issued a limited-run "Lonnie Mack Signature Edition" of Number 7. In 2010, it was featured in Star Guitars: 101 Guitars That Rocked The World. In 2011, Walter Carter, author of The Guitar Collection, named Number 7 one of the world's "150 most elite guitars". In 2012, Rolling Stone magazine named it one of "20 iconic guitars".

"Blue-eyed soul" vocals

Throughout his career, Mack's vocals blended white and black Southern roots influences. One commentator dubbed his singing style "country-esque blues". His best-known vocals were gospel-inspired "blue-eyed soul" ballads. Most failed to chart, but they have consistently drawn praise from critics and popular music historians:1968: "It is truly the voice of Lonnie Mack that sets him apart...primarily a gospel singer...sincerity and intensity that's hard to find anywhere." – Alec Dubro, Rolling Stone1983: "Ultimately—for consistency and depth of feeling—the best blue-eyed soul is defined by Lonnie Mack's ballads and virtually everything The Righteous Brothers recorded. Lonnie Mack wailed a soul ballad as gutsily as any black gospel singer. The anguished inflections which stamped his best songs had a directness which would have been wholly embarrassing in the hands of almost any other white vocalist." – Bill Millar, History of Rock1992: "The first of the guitar-hero records is also one of the best. And for perhaps the last time, the singing on such a disc was worthy of the guitar." – Jimmy Guterman, The 100 Best Rock 'n' Roll Records Of All Time2001: ""Why?", Mack wails, transforming it into a word of three syllables. "Why-y-y?" It's sweaty slow-dance stuff, with an organ intro, a stinging guitar solo, and, after the last emotional chorus, four simple notes on the guitar as a coda. There's no sadder, dustier, beerier song in all of Rock". – James Curtis, Fortune2002: "For me, his vocal records became a metaphor for soul music; when I heard them, I finally understood what the term meant." – Randy McNutt, Guitar Towns2009: "[Mack's "Why?" (1963) is] the greatest deep soul record ever made ... you can feel the ground shaking under [Mack's] feet ... a cry of anguish so extreme you have to close your eyes in shame over witnessing it ... Mack's scream at the end has never been matched. God help us if anyone ever tops it. – Greil Marcus, Songs Left Out of Nan Goldin's Ballad of Sexual Dependency 2016: "Up to April the 21st 2016, the day he died, Lonnie Mack was the best living white soul singer in the world, so good that he could even be mentioned in the same sentence as some of the all-time great black stars of what is essentially a black genre, and yes, I'm talking about the likes of Bobby Bland, Wilson Pickett and others." – Dave Stephens, Toppermost2021': "A major branch of Soul straddled the line between R&B and Country. The blue-eyed soul singer who might best demonstrate this is Lonnie Mack, [whose] influence and standing among musicians far exceeded his [commercial] success." - James E. Perrone, Listen To Soul! Exploring a Musical GenreRepresentative blue-eyed-soul vocals from his catalog include: Why ("The Wham of that Memphis Man", 1963) Where There's A Will ("The Wham of that Memphis Man", 1963)Baby, What's Wrong? ("The Wham of that Memphis Man", 1963)She Don't Come Here Anymore ("Glad I'm in the Band", 1969) 
 Let Them Talk ("Glad I'm in the Band", 1969) My Babe ("Whatever's Right", 1969) Gotta Be An Answer ("Whatever's Right", 1969)Stormy Monday (live, "Live at Coco's", rec. 1983, rel. 1999) Why (live, "Live at Coco's", rec. 1983, rel. 1999)The Things I Used To Do (live, "Live at Coco's", rec. 1983, rel. 1999)Stop ("Strike Like Lightning", 1985) I Found A Love (live, "Attack of the Killer V", 1990) Stop (live, "Attack of the Killer V", 1990)

Final years

Mack released his final album, Lonnie Mack Live: Attack of the Killer V, in 1990, but continued to perform, mostly in small venues, into the early 2000s. His last commercial performances were in 2004. Although he soon found that he "miss[ed] the stage, performing, and making people happy", he remained retired except for a handful of isolated special appearances over the next few years:

On February 17, 2007, he performed Cincinnati Jail at a Nashville organ-transplant benefit concert for Pure Prairie League singer-bassist Michael Reilly.

On November 15, 2008, he performed Wham! at the Rock and Roll Hall of Fame's 93rd birthday salute to electric guitar pioneer, Les Paul. Later in the evening, he participated in a blues jam with Les Paul and a lineup of prominent rock guitarists.

On April 4, 2009, at age 67, he spontaneously took the stage at a rural Tennessee roadhouse, performing Cincinnati Jail with an electric guitar borrowed from the house band's lead player, who wrote:

In 2010, again with a borrowed guitar, he performed Memphis at the final reunion of his Memphis-era band. There is no account of Mack performing thereafter.

In 2011, he released a handful of kitchen-table acoustic recordings via the internet. About that time, he was also reportedly working on a memoir and engaged in a songwriting collaboration with award-winning country and blues tunesmith Bobby Boyd.

In 2012, early rock guitar sensation Travis Wammack asked Mack to join him on a proposed tour to be billed as "Double Mack Attack". Mack declined, saying that he "...wasn't in good shape. He said he can't play standing up any more [and] it's hard to hold a Flying V sitting down."

Mack died from "natural causes" on April 21, 2016 (age 74) at a hospital near his log-cabin home in rural Tennessee. In the media, his death was overshadowed by that of rock superstar Prince, who died on the same day. Mack was buried in Aurora, Indiana.

Discography

Original studio albums

1964: The Wham of that Memphis Man!1969: Glad I'm in the Band1969: Whatever's Right1971: The Hills of Indiana1973: Dueling Banjos (with Rusty York)
1977: Home at Last1978: Lonnie Mack with Pismo1985: Strike Like Lightning1986: Second Sight1988: Roadhouses and Dance Halls1999: South (rec. 1978)

Live albums
1990: Lonnie Mack Live: Attack of the Killer V (recorded December 1989)
1998: Live At Coco's (recorded 1983)

Re-issues and compilations
1970: "For Collectors Only" (Re-issue of "The Wham of that Memphis Man" with two additional tunes from 1964)

Session work (guitar)

Career recognition and awards

See also
 Blues-rock
 Southern rock
 Blue-eyed soul
 Gibson Flying V
 Guitar solo

Further reading and listening
 Interviews and Commentaries
 Guralnick, "Lonnie Mack: Funky Country Living", 2020.
 McNutt, "McGonigal, Ohio: Lonnie on the Move", 2002. 
 Interview by John Broughton on Australian radio, 2000.
 McDevitt, "Unsung Guitar Hero Lonnie Mack", Gibson Lifestyle on-line, 2007
 Smith, "The Guitar Player's Guitar Player: Gritz Speaks With Guitar Hero Lonnie Mack", June 2000
 Nager, "Guitar Greatness", Cincinnati Enquirer (Cincinnati.com), March 13, 1998
 Schaber, "Mule Train", Cincinnati Magazine, October 2000 issue, pp. 74–83
 Guitar and gear
 O'Hara, "Lonnie Mack's Flying V", The Unique Guitar Blog, December 23, 2009
 Forte, "Lonnie Mack: That Memphis Man is Back", 1978, p. 20, as quoted in Guitar Player staff, "We Lost Another Guitar Hero", Guitar Player magazine on-line, April 21, 2016
 Fjestadt & Meiners, "Lonnie Mack's Bigsby-Enhanced Korina Flying V", 2007.
 Documentaries
 "Blues-rock Virtuoso Lonnie Mack Rambles On", with Ed Ward, NPR radio, July 31, 2008
 "Lonnie Mack Special" with Lee Hay, WVXU Radio (Cincinnati), April 25, 2016
 "Lonnie Mack", two-hour documentary, Dr Boogie radio show on Classic 21 radio (Belgium, en Francais), April 2016.
 Posthumous editorials, tributes, and reviews
 New York Times: Grimes, "Lonnie Mack, Singer and Guitarist Who Pioneered Blues-Rock, Dies At 74", New York Times on-line, April 22, 2018
 Washington Post: McArdle, "Lonnie Mack, guitarist and singer who influenced blues and rock acts, dies at 74", Washington Post on-line, April 25, 2016
 Houston Chronicle: Dansby, "Music and Death 2016", Houston Chronicle on-line, December 29, 2016
 Rolling Stone: Kreps, "Lonnie Mack, Blues-Rock Guitar Great, Dead at 74", Rolling Stone online, April 23, 2016
 Guitar World: "Pioneering Guitarist Lonnie Mack Dead at 74", Guitar World on-line, April 22, 2016
 Downbeat: Reed, "Blues Guitarist Lonnie Mack Dies at 74", Downbeat on-line, April 22, 2016.
 American Blues Scene: Kerzner, "Breaking: Pioneering Guitarist Lonnie Mack Dead at 74", April 22, 2016
 Keeping The Blues Alive: Hagood, "Lonnie Mack: Remembering His Trailblazing Blues-Rock Guitar Virtuosity", Keeping the Blues Alive, April 29, 2016
 Toppermost: Stephens, "Lonnie Mack", TopperMost'' on-line, April 2016.

References

1941 births
2016 deaths
American blues guitarists
American male guitarists
American blues singers
Elektra Records artists
People from Dearborn County, Indiana
20th-century American guitarists
People from Smithville, Tennessee
20th-century American male musicians
American rock guitarists
Country musicians from Indiana
Alligator Records artists
Capitol Records artists
Jewel Records artists
King Records artists
Ace Records (United Kingdom) artists
Epic Records artists